Yoel Alroy (born 1930) is an Israeli footballer and politician. He played as a forward for Maccabi Netanya and after his retirement from football served as the mayor of Netanya from 1983 to 1993.

Early life 
Yoel was born in 1930 in Petah Tikva, but moved to Netanya at the age of the three weeks where his parents ran an orchard, which was destroyed during the 1936–1939 Arab revolt in Palestine, leaving Yoel's family nearly bankrupt. He studied in the Biyalik school, where he concluded his studies in 1947. While in High School, Alroy served in the Haganah, and joined the Maccabi Netanya, beginning his career in sports.

Legal practice and sports career 
In the late 1940s and early 1950s, Yoel studied in the Hebrew University of Jerusalem, earning a degree in Law in 1954. He subsequently opened a small law firm in Netanya, and married Pnina, his wife. As a lawyer, Yoel participated in the Kastner trial. He also remained within the IDF, and fought in the Suez Crisis, the Six-Day War, and the War of Attrition. He remained in the Maccabi Netanya during this time, and continued to play sports.

Political career 
Yoel entered local politics in 1973, joining the Herut party, and being placed second on its slate for the Netanya City Council. He was elected in 1974, but his party failed to win the mayoral election, leading to the resignation of fellow city council member and leader of the opposition, Oved Ben-Ami. As a result, Alroy became leader of the opposition, and served in the position from 1974 to 1983.

In 1984, he made his intentions  to retire from political life clear, but was pressured by his supporters into making a run for Mayor of Netanya. He won the subsequent general election and became the city's 10th Mayor.

Shortly after Elrai took office, several new schools were opened, and existing ones were renovated. The municipal education system initiated extracirrucular activities, increased assistance in education for the disadvantaged and directed resources to unique projects in education, such as assisting in the absorption of thousands of immigrants from Russia and Ethiopia settling in Netanya, nurturing gifted children and assisting community centers and youth in distress. More than a third of the city's budget was directed towards education during this period. In addition, Alroy made efforts to reform the city's bureaucracy, merging departments and replacing department leaders with people he saw as more qualified and competent.

During his first term as mayor of Netanya there was a wave of development: he was responsible for the new boardwalk on the beach as well as renovating Herzl street and the Tel-Hai pedestrian street. He assisted in the construction of the privately-owned Sharon Mall, and efforts were made to introduce new gardens and playgrounds, while renovating the city's sidewalks.

He won re-election in 1989, and continued the trend of bureaucratic reform and expansion of local infrastructure, but lost re-election in 1993 to the Likud's candidate. He ran again in 1998, this time as an independent, but was not elected.

Alroy later served as chairman of the Association for the Elderly in Netanya, also known as Hadar.

Honours
Netanya Cup:
Winner (1): 1953
Israel State Cup:
Runner-up (1): 1954

References

1930 births
Living people
Israeli Jews
Jewish Israeli sportspeople
Israeli footballers
Israeli military personnel
Israeli lawyers
Jewish Israeli politicians
Association football forwards
Maccabi Netanya F.C. players
Liga Leumit players
Mayors of places in Israel
Footballers from Netanya
People from Netanya
Hebrew University of Jerusalem Faculty of Law alumni
Likud politicians